Lebidoti is a village in Suriname with a population of about 1,000 and two nearby villages of Bakoe and Pitean. The people are of Maroon descent, specifically the Aukan tribe, and moved to this specific location when the building of the Afobaka dam created the Brokopondo Reservoir.

Healthcare 
Lebidoti is home to a Medische Zending healthcare centre.

References

Populated places in Brokopondo District
Ndyuka settlements